Sixth June are an audio/visual project from Berlin with origins in Belgrade, formed in 2007 by visual artist Laslo Antal and actress Lidija Andonov. All their releises have seen the pair explore multiple sides to their dark cinematic post new wave sound.

History 
In 2009 Sixth June performed at EXIT Festival in Novi Sad. 
2010 they moved to Berlin and released their first album Everytime on German label Genetic Music and had appearance at BIMfest in Antwerp. The Sixth June Video “Oh no it's burning” was part of the Berlin Music Week. On sixth June 2011 they released the EP Back For A Day.

2012 they were performing at Wave-Gotik-Treffen in Germany. 2013 they released the mini album Pleasure
and had appearance at Nuit Fantastique in Brussels and Summer Darkness in Utrecht. After Berghain concert in 2014 the Berliner Zeitung describes their sound as "sweet, cool, dark elektropop" and close to Propaganda or Depeche Mode.
Music videos and live projections are a large part of the performance of Sixth June, adding a theatrical aspect. Having two people in the band who are closely connected to film, theatre and video art helps Sixth June to be recognizable not only by the music but the visual-image they create as well. 
After the release of their Pleasure EP (in December 2013), peek-a-boo magazine described their work as: The music from Laslo Antal and Lidija Andonov sounds indeed very 80’s, but at the same time contemporary as well. 
After hearing their brand new 5 tracks 12 EP Pleasure, I feel like to use these words again....

 Name and influences 
Sixth June's band name has no concrete reference to June 6 in history. Their music is strongly influenced by 1980s Dark culture bands and their albums, such as Seventeen Seconds (The Cure, 1980), Music for the Masses (Depeche Mode, 1987), Dead Can Dance (1984), Mask (Bauhaus, 1981).
Formative is Lidija Andonov's warm melancholic voice.

 Discography 
 Everytime (2010) – Genetic Music / No Emb Blanc
 Back For A Day, EP (2011) – Mannequin Records
 Pleasure, EP (2013) – Mannequin Records
 Virgo Rising (2017) - aufnahme+wiedergabe
 Without a sign (demos and unreleased tracks, 2018) - aufnahme+wiedergabe
 Trust'' (2020) - The state51 Conspiracy
 1984 (2021) - Sweet Sensation

Videos 
 Everytime (2007, in Novi Sad)
 Oh No it's Burning (2008, in Subotica)
 Come Closer (2011, in Berlin)
 Back for a day (2011, in Berlin)
 Drowning (2014)
 Night before (2017)
 Nebo (2017)
 Other Side of Love (2018) 
 Call me, II (2018)
 In Dreams (2019)
 Winter didn't Come (2020)
 Negde Neko (2020) 
 Read all my dreams - short film (2020)

References

External links 
 Official Site
 Official Facebook
 Noisey Interview: Sixth June Are Twisting History, Vice magazine, December 2013 (in german)
 Laslo Antal website
 Samples of debut Everytime (mp3), No Emb Blanc
 Label info, Mannequin Records

Minimal music
Musical groups established in 2007
German synthpop groups
Musical groups from Berlin
Serbian pop music groups
Musical groups from Belgrade